Robert Iain Wainwright (born 22 March 1965) is a former rugby union footballer who was capped 37 times for Scotland (Captain 16 times) and once for the British and Irish Lions. He played flanker.

Early life
Wainwright was born in Perth, Scotland, the only son of five children. He was educated at Glenalmond College, where his father Jim was a long-serving geography teacher and former Warden (Headmaster), and read medicine at Magdalene College, Cambridge on an Army bursary. While at Cambridge he earned full blues in rugby and boxing.

Rugby career
Wainwright received his first cap in 1992, as a reserve against . He could play all back row positions, including flanker and number 8. Wainwright came to prominence in the 1994 Five Nations Championship with a try against England, and also scored a try against France in the final pool match of the 1995 Rugby World Cup. He became Scotland's first professional Captain following the retirement of Gavin Hastings after the Rugby World Cup in 1995, and led Scotland to a surprise second place behind England in the 1996 Five Nations Championship.

Richard Bath wrote of him that his 
"quiet and urbane manner belies a steely resolve that led Jim Telfer to eventually appoint the utility back-row man as skipper after Gavin Hastings' retirement in 1995... he was forced to wait until the famous back row of Jeffrey, Calder and White called it a day after the 1991 World Cup before he could force his way into the Scottish squad... An unshowy player who does so much of the unseen work, Wainwright is a useful tail of the line jumper and a consistently good tackler."

When Wainwright was injured in 1996, Gregor Townsend took on the position of national captain.

Wainwright returned to captain the side in January 1997.

Army career
A doctor by profession, Wainwright was commissioned into the Royal Army Medical Corps in 1987 and was promoted to Lieutenant in 1990, Captain on the completion of his medical training in 1991 and Major in 1996. He continued to be employed by the Army while also playing semi-professionally. As the 1997 Five Nations Championship approached, Wainright anticipated that he might be deployed to Bosnia with NATO peacekeeping troops but this did not occur. He retired in 1999.

Personal life
Wainwright married Romayne in 1992. They have four children: Douglas, Natasha, Alexander, Cameron.

After ending his rugby career, Wainwright had planned to return to a career in medicine. In 1999 he and his family moved to the island of Coll in the Inner Hebrides, taking ownership of a farm.

References

Further reading

External links
 profile on lionsrugby.com
 Heineken cup profile
 Profile & Statistics at ESPN

1965 births
Living people
20th-century British Army personnel
20th-century Scottish medical doctors
Alumni of Magdalene College, Cambridge
Army rugby union players
British & Irish Lions rugby union players from Scotland
Caledonia Reds players
Cambridge University R.U.F.C. players
Dundee HSFP players
Edinburgh Academicals rugby union players
Glasgow Warriors players
London Scottish F.C. players
North and Midlands players
People educated at Lathallan School
People educated at Glenalmond College
Royal Army Medical Corps officers
Rugby union flankers
Rugby union players from Perth, Scotland
Scotland international rugby union players
Scottish rugby union players
West Hartlepool R.F.C. players